Brian Scott Bevil (born September 5, 1971) is a former Major League Baseball pitcher who played for three seasons. He pitched for the Kansas City Royals in 60 career games.

External links

1971 births
Living people
Angelina Roadrunners baseball players
Major League Baseball pitchers
Baseball players from Houston
Kansas City Royals players
MacArthur High School (Harris County, Texas) alumni